Terry Johnson may refer to:

Terry Johnson (cricketer) (born 1941), former English cricketer
Terry Johnson (dramatist) (born 1955), British dramatist and director
Terry Johnson (entrepreneur) (born 1935), American entrepreneur in data storage
Terry Johnson (footballer) (born 1949), British footballer
Terry Johnson (Georgia politician) (born 1950), Georgia State Representative
Terry Johnson (ice hockey) (born 1958), hockey player
Terry Johnson (Ohio politician) (born 1956), member of the Ohio House of Representatives
Terry "Buzzy" Johnson (born 1938), American popular music singer, songwriter and music producer
Terry "Tank" Johnson (born 1981), American professional football defensive tackle
Terry Johnson (basketball), American basketball coach